Pristimantis vicarius is a species of frog in the family Strabomantidae.
It is endemic to Colombia.
Its natural habitats are tropical moist montane forests, high-altitude shrubland, high-altitude grassland, and rivers.
It is threatened by habitat loss.

References

vicarius
Endemic fauna of Colombia
Amphibians of Colombia
Amphibians of the Andes
Amphibians described in 1983
Taxonomy articles created by Polbot